Sarik or Serik may refer to:
 Serik, East Azerbaijan
 Sarik, Zanjan